Ramayanam, also known as Bala Ramayanam, is a 1997 Indian Telugu-language mythological film directed by Gunasekhar and produced by M. S. Reddy. Based on the Hindu epic Ramayana, the film features overs 3000 child actors. It stars N. T. Rama Rao Jr. as Lord Rama and Smitha Madhav as Sita.

The film is released on 11 April 1997. It received the National Film Award for Best Children's Film and two Nandi Awards.

Plot
The story deals with lord Rama and his retaliation against Ravana for the kidnapping of his wife goddesses Sita.

Cast

 N. T. Rama Rao Jr. as Rama
 Smitha Madhav as Sita
 Narayanam Nikhil as Lakshmana
 Swathi Kumar as Ravana
 Arun Gangadhar as Anjaneya
 Aditya Varma as Dasharatha
 Chiranjeevi as Bharata
 Manisha Chudamani as Kausalya
 Vasundhara as Kaikeyi
 Suma as Sumitra
 Svetha Rao as Urmila
 Sunaina as Sabari

Soundtrack
The music was composed by Madhavapeddi Suresh.

Songs:
 "Adi Subhodaya Vela" - S. P. Balasubrahmanyam
 "Virisi Viriyani Malliyalara" - K. S. Chithra
 "Sitaramula Kalyanam "
 "Ramayya Rajavutadanta"
 "Purajanula Sambaramu" - S. P. Balasubrahmanyam
 "Entha Manchivadivayya"
 "Andabayani Jantaga" - K. J. Yesudas, K. S. Chithra
 "Budi Budi Adigulu"
 "Adigadigo Modalayindi" - S. P. Balasubrahmanyam
Poems:
 "Aa Surya Bhagavanudu" - B. Sai Karthikeya
 "Hari Hari Entha Maata"
 "Vande Sri Raghuvamsa"
 "Gaduvu Lopala"
 "Aagumaagumu Talli"
 "Nanu Talliga "
 "Dharma Samsthapanarthammu"
 "Poulastya Brahmaga" - B. Sai Karthikeya
 "Vinumo Raghava"
 "Ramayanammu" - Mangalampalli Balamuralikrishna
Slokas:
 "Jata Kataha Sambhrama" (from Shiva Tandava Stotram)
 "Kausalya Supraja Rama" (from Suprabhatam/Valmiki Ramayana) - Mangalampalli Balamuralikrishna
 "Sri Anjaneyam" (from Anjaneya Dandakam)

Production
The film's cast features over 3000 child actors.

Critical response
Upon release, the film received positive reviews from critics.

Awards
The film received National Film Award for Best Children's Film in 1997 for "presenting the classical Indian epic in an entertaining narrative style with child actors playing all legendary characters with ease and nerve." Director Gunasekhar and producer M. S. Reddy were presented the award.

Nandi Awards
Best Children's Film - Gold - M. S. Reddy
Bbest Child Actress - Swathi

References

External links

1997 films
1990s Telugu-language films
Films based on the Ramayana
Hindu mythological films
Films directed by Gunasekhar
Indian children's films
Best Children's Film National Film Award winners
Films scored by Madhavapeddi Suresh